This article concerns the systems of transportation in Laos. Laos is a country in Asia, which possesses a number of modern transportation systems, including several highways and a number of airports. As a landlocked country, Laos possesses no ports or harbours on the sea, and the difficulty of navigation on the Mekong means that this is also not a significant transport route.

Geography and transport limits 

Because of its mountainous topography and lack of development, Laos has few reliable transportation routes. This inaccessibility has historically limited the ability of any government to maintain a presence in areas distant from the national or provincial capitals and has limited interchange and communication among villages and ethnic groups.

The Mekong and Nam Ou are the only natural channels suitable for large-draft boat transportation, and from December through May low water limits the size of the draft that may be used over many routes. Laotians in lowland villages located on the banks of smaller rivers have traditionally traveled in pirogues for fishing, trading, and visiting up and down the river for limited distances.

Otherwise, travel is by ox-cart over level terrain or by foot. The steep mountains and lack of roads have caused upland ethnic groups to rely entirely on pack baskets and horse packing for transportation.

The road system is not extensive. A rudimentary network begun under French colonial rule and continued from the 1950s has provided an important means of increased intervillage communication, movement of market goods, and a focus for new settlements. As of mid-1994, travel in most areas was difficult and expensive, and most Laotians traveled only limited distances, if at all. As a result of ongoing improvements in the road system started during the early 1990s, it is expected that in the future villagers will more easily be able to seek medical care, send children to schools at district centers, and work outside the village.

Rail

Laos has two railway lines: the standard gauge Boten–Vientiane railway spanning northern and central Laos, and a shorter metre gauge spur line connecting Thanaleng with the Thai railway network.

Rail transport has not played a significant part in Laos's transport sector, since the country largely lacks the required infrastructure, though that is expected to change after the opening of the Boten–Vientiane railway.

Highways

Right-hand traffic (RHT) is observed in Laos.

Laos constructed a new highway in 2007 connecting Savannakhet to the Vietnamese border at Lao Bao, with funding from the Japanese government. This has greatly improved transport across Laos. This highway can be traversed in a few hours, while in 2002 the trip took over nine hours.

Laos is connected across the Mekong River to Thailand by First and Second Thai-Lao Friendship Bridges. Vientiane is linked to Nong Khai by the First Friendship Bridge. The Third Thai-Lao Friendship Bridge began construction in March 2009 linking Nakhon Phanom Province in northeastern Thailand and Khammouane Province in Laos. It was completed on 11 November 2011.

Laos opened a highway connection to Kunming in April 2008. The Fourth Thai-Lao Friendship Bridge opened to the public on 11 December 2013 linking Kunming to Bokeo, Laos and Chiang Rai. It reduces travel time to five hours.

Expressway 

On 20 December 2020, the Vientiane–Vang Vieng Expressway, the first expressway in Laos, was completed.  Construction began at the end of 2018 and was initially scheduled to finish in 2021. The road, which includes twin tunnels almost 900 metres long through Phoupha Mountain,  shortens the route by 43 km as compared with the existing Route No 13. The expressway toll is 550 kip per kilometre, or about 62,000 kip for a one-way trip between Vientiane and Vang Vieng. The Vientiane-Vang Vieng expressway is the first section of a planned expressway from Vientiane through the northern provinces to Boten in Luang Namtha Province, which borders China.

National Route list 

Route 1: Rantouy, Phongsaly (China)-Attapeu (Cambodia)
Route 2: Thai Chang border-Muang Ngeun border
Route 3: Nateuy-Houayxay (Thailand)
Route 4: Luang Prabang-Kenethao
Route 5: Tha Heua-Xaysomboun (Vietnam) 
Route 6: Phou Lao-Namsoi
Route 7: Phou Khoun-Namcan border
Route 8: Vienkham-Laksao-Namphao border
Route 9: Savannakhet-Lao Bao (Vietnam)
Route 10: Vientiane-Bankeun-Phonhone
Route 11: Vientiane-Paklay
Route 12: Thakhek-Mụ Giạ Pass(Vietnam)
Route 13: Boten (China)-Vientiane-Veunkham(Cambodia)
Route 14: Pakse-Champasak town-Cambodia border
Route 15: Napong-Salavan-Lalay border
Route 16: Chongmek-Pakse-Paxong-xekong-Namgiang border
Route 17: Luang Namtha-Muang Sing-Xieng Kok (Myanmar)
Route 18: Thang Beng-Attapeu-Phukuea border
Route 19: Ban Pakha Kao-Boun Neua-Phongsali-Hatsa
Route 20: Pakse-Salavan

Water transport
About  of navigable water routes exist in Laos, primarily the Mekong and its tributaries.

Pipelines
Laos has  of pipelines for the transport of petroleum products.

Airports

Laos possesses 52 airports, of which nine have paved runways.

See also 
 Laos
 Lao Airlines
 Vientiane
  Railway stations in Laos

References

External links 

 UN Map of Laos
 Map of railways in Laos, Cambodia, and Vietnam – does not show Thailand or China